Hypsopygia regina is a species of snout moth in the genus Hypsopygia. It was described by Arthur Gardiner Butler in 1879 and is known from Korea, Japan, Myanmar, India and Russia.

Adults are on wing from June to August.

References

Moths described in 1879
Pyralini
Moths of Japan
Moths of Asia